was a Japanese philosopher who promoted the concept of World Government for purposes of peace.

Career
Tanikawa studied in the Department of Philosophy at the University of Kyoto, where he was one of the students of Kitaro Nishida, the leader of the Kyoto School.

Tanikawa introduced philosophical ideas in Japan through his translations of Georg Simmel and Immanuel Kant. His major philosophical influence was Johann Wolfgang von Goethe. He questioned how world peace could be realized in the face of nuclear proliferation at the beginning of the Cold War.

He was the father of the poet Shuntarō Tanikawa.

References

1895 births
1989 deaths
20th-century Japanese translators
Kyoto University alumni
20th-century Japanese philosophers